The Propeller Venture Accelerator is a joint venture between Dublin City University and Irelandia Investments. Launched in 2011, it is an Irish-based organization that invests in early stage information and communications technology companies. Propeller was recently  named as the "7th best Accelerator in Europe" by the Kauffman Fellows Program.

Selection process 
Propeller has a number of stages in its selection process:

 Initially the written applications are vetted by the mentors, short-listing a "Top 30".
 These 30 are then invited to present in front of a panel of mentors.  
 Those successful are met for due diligence.
 The final stage is a presentation in front of the investors of Propeller.

Portfolio 
Each year Propeller has the capability to take 6-10 companies.

By its 3rd year, Propeller had a portfolio of 12 companies.

Propeller 1.0 

 Associate Mobile
 Fantom
 GreenEgg
 Healthcomms
 Simple Lifeforms
 Vendorshop

Propeller 2.0 

 Death Buy Fashion
 Picturk
 Seoige Technologies
 Swiftqueue
 Videoelephant
 Zeto Technologies

See also
 Startup accelerator
 Business incubator
 Corporate accelerator
 List of startup accelerators

References 

Investment companies of Ireland
Mentorships
Financial services companies established in 2011
Startup accelerators